Iran's Book of the Year Awards is an annual award about books in categories of religion, social sciences, language, applied sciences, art and literature. 
It is the most prestigious book award in Iran and is granted by the Iranian president during a ceremony.

History
This award was founded in 1953 and it was awarded by Mohammad Reza Pahlavi during the ceremony Salam Nowrouz. Granting this award after the Islamic Revolution was revived in 1983.

References

Iranian literary awards
1953 establishments in Iran
Iran's Book of the Year